Ahmed Abdelhalim Ghanem (born 12 January 1959) is an Egyptian hurdler. He competed in the 400 metres hurdles at the 1984 Summer Olympics and the 1988 Summer Olympics.

References

External links
 

1959 births
Living people
Athletes (track and field) at the 1984 Summer Olympics
Athletes (track and field) at the 1988 Summer Olympics
Egyptian male hurdlers
Olympic athletes of Egypt
Place of birth missing (living people)
Mediterranean Games medalists in athletics
Mediterranean Games silver medalists for Egypt
Athletes (track and field) at the 1983 Mediterranean Games
20th-century Egyptian people